Smash and Dash may refer to:

 Smash and Dash, the former nickname for the duo of Tennessee Titans running backs LenDale White and Chris Johnson
 Smash and Dash, the former nickname for the duo of Carolina Panthers running backs DeAngelo Williams and Jonathan Stewart, later known as "Double Trouble"